John Thayer (1755 – 17 February 1815) was the first native of New England ordained to the Roman Catholic priesthood. He was born in Boston, Massachusetts. Thayer was educated at Yale College and was a Protestant in his early life. He was ordained as a Congregationalist minister and served as a chaplain during the American Revolutionary War. While visiting Rome in 1783, he converted to the Roman Catholic faith, an act which caused a sensation in New England at the time. He credited his conversion to miracles attributed to the noted mendicant, Saint Benedict Joseph Labre, who lived and died there in that period.

Thayer studied for the priesthood with the Sulpician order in Paris, where he was ordained in 1789. Upon his return to Boston, he established a small chapel in School Street, primarily for French Catholics.

After a brief stint serving the Catholic community of Boston, he left to serve the scattered Catholics of Virginia and Kentucky. He had a rather checkered career mostly because of his erratic and confrontational temperament. In 1803, he returned to Europe and finally settled in Limerick, Ireland, United Kingdom where he was much more successful in his ministry. He died there in 1815.

After his death, his estate was used to found an Ursuline convent on Mount Benedict in Charlestown, Massachusetts. It was founded by the three daughters of the family with whom he lived while in Limerick. The first convent to be established in New England, it was burned down by a nativist crowd in anti-Catholic rioting in 1834.

References

Sources
 
An Account of the Conversion of the Reverend John Thayer

1755 births
1815 deaths
18th-century Roman Catholic priests
Converts to Roman Catholicism from Congregationalism
American former Protestants
American expatriates in the United Kingdom
American expatriates in France
18th-century Congregationalist ministers
American emigrants to Ireland
Roman Catholic clergy from Boston
Yale College alumni
American Congregationalist ministers
19th-century American Roman Catholic priests
18th-century American clergy